Cylindropuntia bigelovii, the teddy-bear cholla (choy-ya), is a cholla cactus species native to Northwestern Mexico, and to the United States in California, Arizona, and Nevada.

Description
Cylindropuntia bigelovii has a soft appearance due to its solid mass of very formidable spines that completely cover the stems, leading to its sardonic nickname of "teddy bear" or "jumping teddy bear".

The branches or lobes are at the top of the trunk and are nearly horizontal. Lower branches typically fall off, and the trunk darkens with age. The silvery-white spines, which are actually a form of leaf, almost completely obscure the stem with a fuzzy-looking but impenetrable defense.

The yellow-green flowers emerge at the tips of the stems in May and June. These fruits contain few if any viable seeds as the plant usually reproduces through a dispersal strategy of dropped  or carried stems. These stems are often carried for some distance by sticking to the fur or skin of animals and are especially painful to remove. When a piece of this cholla sticks to an animal or person, a good method to remove the cactus is with a hair comb. The spines have microscopic barbs which point backwards and hold on tightly. Often small stands of these chollas form, most of which are largely clones of the same individual.

Like its cousin the jumping cholla, the stems detach easily, and the ground around a mature plant is often littered with scattered cholla balls and small plants starting where these balls have rooted.

Wildlife 
Desert pack rats such as the desert woodrat gather these balls around their burrows, creating a defense against most predators like kit fox and coyote, however several species of snake feed on the rat, keeping its population balanced.

The cactus wren can be found perched on the cholla and other cacti. They also use a variety of cacti for nesting purposes.

The "jumping" part of the name is said to originated because a person walking in the desert can step on a stem on the ground with heel of a boot or shoe can cause the stem to swivel up and embed spines in the walker's calf.

Distribution

In the Lower Colorado River Valley, the most dense Cylindropuntia bigelovii stands are at higher elevations, in the rockiest sites. There are fewer Sonoran Desert or Colorado Desert plant association species, but two are common though reduced in size: ocotillo (Fouquieria splendens) and saguaro (Carnegiea gigantea).

The teddy bear cholla is also found in a protected Cholla Cactus Garden as part of the Joshua Tree National Park among other desert plants such as the desert senna, pencil cholla, creosote bush, jojoba, and climbing milkweed Sarcostemma cynanxhoides ssp. hartweggi which can climb and cover the teddy bear cholla and may even kill it.

Gallery

References 

 The Living Desert
 Teddy-bear Cholla – University of Arizona Pima County Cooperative Extension entry

External links
 Cylindropuntia bigelovii photo gallery at Opuntia Web
 Jepson Manual Treatment of Cylindropuntia bigelovii
 Cylindropuntia bigelovii — UC Photo gallery

bigelovii
Cacti of the United States
Cacti of Mexico
Flora of the California desert regions
Flora of the Sonoran Deserts
Flora of Arizona
Flora of Nevada
Flora of Sonora
Natural history of the Colorado Desert
Natural history of the Lower Colorado River Valley
North American desert flora